The Yugoslavia women's national under-16 basketball team was the girls' basketball team, administered by Basketball Federation of Yugoslavia, that represented SFR Yugoslavia in international under-16 (under age 16) women's basketball competitions, consisted mainly of the European Championship for Cadettes, nowadays known as the FIBA Europe Under-16 Championship for Women.

After the dissolution of SFR Yugoslavia in 1991, the successor countries all set up their own national under-16 teams.

Individual awards 
Top Scorer
 Zagorka Počeković – 1982
 Danira Nakić – 1985
 Žana Lelas – 1987
 Vedrana Grgin – 1991

European Championship competitive record

Coaches

New national teams 
After the dissolution of SFR Yugoslavia in 1991, five new countries were created: Bosnia and Herzegovina, Croatia, FYR Macedonia, FR Yugoslavia (in 2003, renamed to Serbia and Montenegro) and Slovenia. In 2006, Montenegro became an independent nation and Serbia became the legal successor of Serbia and Montenegro. In 2008, Kosovo declared independence from Serbia and became a FIBA member in 2015.

Here is a list of women's national under-16 teams on the SFR Yugoslavia area:
  (1992–present)
  (1992–present)
  (1993–present)
  (1992–2006)
  (2006–present)
  (2006–present)
  (2015–present)
  (1992–present)

See also 
 Yugoslavia women's national under-19 basketball team
 Yugoslavia women's national under-18 basketball team

References

Women's national under-16 basketball teams
Under
Youth sport in Yugoslavia